The East Humboldt Wilderness is a protected wilderness area in the East Humboldt Range of Elko County, in the northeast section of the state of Nevada in the western United States.

See also
 Nevada Wilderness Areas
 List of wilderness areas in Nevada
 List of U.S. Wilderness Areas
 Wilderness Act

References

External links
 official Humboldt-Toiyabe National Forest website
 National Atlas: Map of Humboldt-Toiyabe National Forest
 NevadaWilderness.org

Humboldt–Toiyabe National Forest
Wilderness areas of Nevada
Protected areas of Elko County, Nevada
East Humboldt Range